Pawnee is a 1957 American Western film directed by George Waggner and written by George Waggner, Louis Vittes and Endre Bohem. The  Trucolor film stars George Montgomery, Bill Williams, Lola Albright, Francis McDonald, Robert Griffin and Dabbs Greer. The film was released on September 7, 1957, by Republic Pictures.

Summary
Pale Arrow was orphaned as a boy and raised as the son of the Pawnee Chief, Wise Eagle. Now an adult, Pale Arrow witnesses his fellow braves attack a wagon driven by two people who are trying to rejoin the rest of a wagon train passing through Pawnee land. Pale Arrow rescues the two individuals and returns them safely to their comrades. Subsequently, he and Wise Eagle come to an agreement whereby Pale Arrow will see if he is able to return to his roots as a white settler. He takes the name Paul Fletcher and becomes a scout for the wagon train. Wise Eagle wants to live in peace with white people but, upon his death, Crazy Fox becomes Chief and stirs up a desire for war in the Pawnee. Paul Fletcher/Pale Arrow is caught between these two worlds and must choose one when it becomes clear the wagon train is about to be attacked.

Cast
George Montgomery as Paul "Pale Arrow" Fletcher
Bill Williams as Matt Delaney
Lola Albright as Meg Alden
Francis McDonald as Uncle Tip Alden 
Robert Griffin as Doc Morgan 
Dabbs Greer as John Brewster
Kathleen Freeman as Mrs. Carter
Charlotte Austin as Dancing Fawn
Ralph Moody as Chief Wise Eagle
Anne Barton as Martha Brewster 
Raymond Hatton as Obie Dilks
Charles Horvath as Crazy Fox
Robert Nash as Carter

References

External links 
 

1957 films
American Western (genre) films
1957 Western (genre) films
Republic Pictures films
Films directed by George Waggner
Films scored by Paul Sawtell
1950s English-language films
1950s American films